Patt Morrison is a journalist, author, and radio-television personality based in Los Angeles and Southern California.

Media
Morrison is a writer for the Los Angeles Times, with the weekly  'Patt Morrison Asks'  column, and received the Joseph M. Quinn award in 2000 from the Los Angeles Press Club for lifetime achievement. In 2006 she began hosting the eponymous public radio program  'Patt Morrison,'  a 2-hour weekday interview-talk program on NPR affiliate KPCC. Her program was dropped in August 2012. Morrison has been a frequent commentator on National Public Radio since 1994, BBC radio and TV, and The Huffington Post blog.  She also founded the PBS daily local news  'Life & Times'  public television program, and co-hosted it on KCET-TV from 1993 to 2001. She won six Emmys and 6 Golden Mike awards for the program. Currently, Morrison fills in as the host of KPCC's "AirTalk" when the show's regular host, Larry Mantle, is unable to do the show.

Life
Originally from Utica, Ohio, Morrison is a 1974 cum laude graduate of Occidental College, and was named its 'Alumnus of the year' in 1995.  In 1998 she was elected to the college's board of trustees.

Her fashion trademark is wearing hats that coordinate with her clothing ensembles; she is always seen in public with one.

She identifies herself as a lacto vegetarian. Pink's Hot Dogs, a Hollywood landmark and establishment known for naming unique hot dog and topping combinations after local cultural icons, has named the vegetarian 'Patt Morrison Baja Veggie hot dog' after her.

Author
Patt Morrison is a fiction and non-fiction author, and in addition to numerous magazine articles  has written: 
 Rio L.A., Tales from the Los Angeles River - a book with photographer Mark LaMonica. "The reality and spirit of the Los Angeles River, a concrete masterpiece of clandestine beauty that stretches from the mountains to the mouth of Long Beach Harbor."
 "Morocco Junction 90210," a story in the book Los Angeles Noir - "a collection of 17 stories about the shadow side of the 'City of Angels'."

References

External links
 The "Patt Morrison" radio show website
 "Patt Morrison Asks" podcasts
 KCET Departures interview with Patt Morrison Award-winning journalist and radio reporter of the Los Angeles area
 An interview with Patt Morrison on Notebook on Cities and Culture

American columnists
American newspaper journalists
American television journalists
Radio personalities from Los Angeles
NPR personalities
Writers from Los Angeles
1952 births
Living people
Emmy Award winners
Occidental College alumni
20th-century American women writers
21st-century American women writers
People from Utica, Ohio
American women non-fiction writers
20th-century American non-fiction writers
21st-century American non-fiction writers
American women television journalists
American women columnists